Artyom Nikolayevich Stepanov (born 5 May 1988) is a former Russian professional footballer.

Club career
He made his debut for FC Anzhi Makhachkala on 13 June 2007 in the Russian Cup game against FC Rotor Volgograd.

External links
 
 

1988 births
Sportspeople from Almaty
Living people
Russian footballers
Association football goalkeepers
FC Anzhi Makhachkala players
FC Saturn Ramenskoye players
FC Lokomotiv Moscow players